is a 1947 black-and-white Japanese film directed by Senkichi Taniguchi  from Akira Kurosawa's screenplay. It was the first film role for Toshirō Mifune, later to become one of Japan's most famous actors. Mifune and the other main actor in the film, Takashi Shimura, later became long-term collaborators of film director Akira Kurosawa.

Plot

Three bank robbers (Mifune, Takashi Shimura, and Yoshio Kosugi) on the run from the police hide out high up in the snowy Japanese mountains in a remote lodge inhabited by an old man, his granddaughter and an intrepid mountaineer (Akitake Kono) trapped there by a recent blizzard.  They don't know that the men are criminals, and a tense standoff starts to unfold.

Cast 
 Toshiro Mifune as Eijima
 Takashi Shimura as Nojiro
 Yoshio Kosugi as Takasugi
 Akitake Kono as Honda
 Setsuko Wakayama as Haruko
 Kokuten Kōdō as Haruko's Grandfather

References

External links 
 

Japanese black-and-white films
1947 films
Films directed by Senkichi Taniguchi
Toho films
Films produced by Tomoyuki Tanaka
Films with screenplays by Akira Kurosawa
Films with screenplays by Senkichi Taniguchi
Films scored by Akira Ifukube
Films about bank robbery
Japanese crime drama films
1947 crime drama films